El Niño is an opera-oratorio by the contemporary American composer John Adams. It was premiered on December 15, 2000, at the Théâtre du Châtelet in Paris by soloists Dawn Upshaw, Lorraine Hunt Lieberson and Willard White, the vocal ensemble Theatre of Voices (consisting of countertenors Daniel Bubeck, Brian Cummings and Steven Rickards), the London Voices, La Maîtrise de Paris, and the Deutsches Symphonie-Orchester Berlin, with Kent Nagano conducting. It has been performed on a number of occasions since, and has been broadcast on BBC Television.

Described as a "nativity oratorio", it retells the Christmas story, with the first half focusing on Mary's thoughts before the birth in the stable in Bethlehem, and the second half covering the aftermath of the birth, Herod's slaughter of the Holy Innocents, and the early life of Jesus.

The text follows the traditional biblical story but also incorporates text from the King James Bible, the Wakefield Mystery Plays, Martin Luther's Christmas Sermon, the Gospel of Luke, and several gnostic gospels from the Apocrypha. Also included are poems by Rosario Castellanos, Sor Juana Inés de la Cruz, Gabriela Mistral, Vicente Huidobro, Rubén Darío, librettist Peter Sellars, and Adams himself. He also quotes Gabriela Mistral's "The Christmas Star" and incorporates a choral setting of "" by Hildegard von Bingen.

Performers
The work is scored for soprano, mezzo-soprano and baritone soloists, a trio of countertenors, a forty-five piece orchestra (including two guitars and a sampling keyboard), SATB chorus, and a children's chorus. It can be performed either as a staged production or as a concert oratorio. The original semi-staged production by Peter Sellars includes dance and film elements.

A shortened version of the work, removing two of the three countertenors and the chorus as well as much of the orchestra, was suggested by soprano Julia Bullock in 2018 for a performance at The Cloisters of the Metropolitan Museum of Art under the title El Niño: Nativity Reconsidered.

Performance history
The American premiere took place on January 11, 2001 at Davies Hall, San Francisco, with Kent Nagano conducting the San Francisco Symphony and San Francisco Symphony Chorus, the Piedmont Children's Choir, and with the same soloists as at the Paris premiere.

It received its collegiate premiere as a semi-staged oratorio on November 6, 2002, at the Indiana University Jacobs School of Music, conducted by Carmen Helena Téllez, with student soloists Su-Hyoun Kim, Hannah Penn and Robert Samels, but also including the professional countertenors of the premiere, Dan Bubeck, Brian Cummings and Steve Rickards, members of Theater of Voices and alumni of the School. The artistic director of Theater of Voices, Paul Hillier was at the time a faculty member of the School. 

It was also given in New York at the Brooklyn Academy of Music in March 2003 by the Los Angeles Philharmonic under Esa-Pekka Salonen, and with the same soloists.

In May 2003 the Atlanta Symphony Orchestra and Chorus performed the work under the direction of Robert Spano and the following month opened the 67th Ravinia Festival with a critically acclaimed performance of the oratorio.

A new and highly praised production, using puppets instead of dancers and film, was given at Spoleto Festival USA in May 2014, directed by John La Bouchardière and featured the Westminster Choir, directed by Joe Miller.

Musical sections
El Niño is approximately two hours long, comprises two sections, and is subdivided further into thirteen sub-sections as follows:

Recordings
2000: DVD video: Sellars' Paris production of El Niño with Dawn Upshaw, Lorraine Hunt Lieberson, Willard White; conductor: Kent Nagano. Arthaus Musik, Cat #101669
2001: 2-CD recording of original cast from the Théâtre du Châtelet, Paris. Nonesuch Records, Cat #79634-2

See also

List of Christmas operas

References

External links
"El Niño: A Nativity Oratorio (1999–2000)" on earbox.com
Kun, Josh, "Death and the maiden: John Adams's El Niño restages the Nativity", The Phoenix, 15–22 November 2001.
McGregor, Andrew, "John Adams El Niño", review of the 2001 recording under Kent Nagano, on bbc.co.uk, 2002

Operas
Oratorios
Opera oratorios
Operas by John Adams (composer)
English-language operas
Spanish-language operas
2000 operas
Christmas operas